The International Children's Peace Prize is awarded annually to a child who has made a significant contribution to advocating children's rights and improving the situation of vulnerable children such as orphans, child labourers and children with HIV/AIDS.

The prize is an initiative of Marc Dullaert, founder of the KidsRights Foundation, an international children's aid and advocacy organisation based in Amsterdam, the Netherlands.

The winner receives a 100,000 euro donation to benefit a charitable project for children, as well as a statuette which has been named the Nkosi in Nkosi Johnson's honour. The statuette is of a child pushing a ball, "show[ing] how a child sets the world in motion."

History
The first Children's Peace Prize was launched in November 2005 during the World Summit of Nobel Peace Laureates in Rome, an annual meeting of Nobel Peace Prize winners and international organisations such as UNICEF and Amnesty International. "We welcome the launch of Children’s Peace Prize during our summit," the summit's closing statement said.

Mikhail Gorbachev presented the 2005 prize, which was posthumously awarded to Nkosi Johnson, a South African boy who brought international attention to children with HIV/AIDS and founded the Nkosi's Haven home for HIV-positive mothers and children.

The 2006 award was handed out by Nobel Peace Prize laureate Frederik Willem de Klerk in a ceremony at the Binnenhof, the seat of the Dutch parliament in The Hague. The 2007 was presented at the Binnenhof by Bob Geldof and Nobel Peace Prize laureate Betty Williams. The 2008 prize was presented by Desmond Tutu.

In 2018 a finalist was Leilua Lino, a human rights activist from Samoa.

Recipients

Similar awards 
An International Children's Peace Prize is also handed out by the Children as the Peacemakers Foundation. The World's Children's Prize for the Rights of the Child is awarded yearly by Swedish organisation Children's World. The Institute for Economics & Peace (IEP) issues a World Children Peace Prize.

Sources
 The Children's Peace Prize
 KidsRights Foundation
 World Summit of Nobel Peace Laureates closing statement
 Telegraaf (Dutch)
 Children as the Peacemakers Foundation

References

External links 
 Winners International Children's Peace Prize

Peace awards
Children's rights organizations
Human rights awards
Awards honoring children or youth
Awards established in 2005